Haidarabad Hazi E. A. B. High School is a combined school in Haidarabad, Muradnagar Upazila, Comilla District, Bangladesh. It was established in 1986. Its Education Institute Identification Number (EIIN) is 105991. It is also known as Haidarabad Hazi Eakub Ali Bhuiyan High School.

History 
The school began in 1986. The school was established on a 3-acre area in Hazi Eakub Ali Bhuiyan Road, Haidarabad.

Facilities
The school has three academic buildings, an administrative building. There is a field in the school area. Other facilities include workshop, auditorium, canteen, and library. There are 13 teachers and two staff. The school has two laboratories.

Student life
The school conducts one shift.

The uniform is a navy blue shirt with blue full trousers and white shoes and black belt. The school monogram is printed on the shirt pocket.

Usually students are admitted in class 6. Admission can be considered in other classes if a vacancy is available or if someone is transferred from another government school. The admission test is usually taken in the first week of January.

Academic performance
The JSC and SSC examinations are conducted by the Board of Secondary and Intermediate Education under the Ministry of Education. (Junior School Certificate (JSC) is a public examination taken by students in Bangladesh after successful completion of eight years of schooling and Secondary School Certificate (SSC) is the diploma awarded for the completion of grade ten, which is equivalent to the O Levels in the UK.)

The major programs are sciences; arts and humanities; and business studies. Students have to elect one of these three programs just before enrollment in the 9th grade for SSC. Results of the exams are published in the form of a GPA. The highest score is GPA-5.

The Comilla Education Board annually ranks schools and colleges from across the region in GPA-5 scorers. The school was awarded as "Best School in Chittagong Division" in 2004 and "Best School" in 2010 by BSB Foundation for good result in SSC and JSC.

Extracurricular activities
 BNCC (Bangladesh National Cadet Core)
 Scouting
 Games and sports (mostly athletics, cricket, badminton and football)
 Debating
 Math and language competitions
 Picnic
 Social development

See also
 Education in Bangladesh
 List of universities and schools in Comilla
 List of schools in Bangladesh

References

 http://hheabhs.comillaboard.gov.bd/

External links
 The school's web site

High schools in Bangladesh
1997 establishments in Bangladesh
Educational institutions established in 1997
Schools in Comilla District